How Stella Got Her Groove Back is the soundtrack to the 1998 film, How Stella Got Her Groove Back. It was released on August 11, 1998, through Flyte Tyme Records and consisted mainly of R&B music. The album was entirely produced by the production duo, Jimmy Jam and Terry Lewis with additional help from Wyclef Jean & Jerry Duplessis as well as Salaam Remi. The soundtrack peaked at number eight on the Billboard 200 albums chart and number three on the Top R&B/Hip-Hop Albums chart, and was certified gold on September 22, 1998, by the RIAA. Two singles were released from the album, "Luv Me, Luv Me" and "Beautiful".

Track listing
"Jazzie B. Intro- 0:14 (Jazzie B)
"Mastablasta '98"- 4:46 (Stevie Wonder & Wyclef Jean)  
"Luv Me, Luv Me"- 5:56 (Shaggy & Janet Jackson)
"Beautiful"- 6:29 (Mary J. Blige)
"Never Say Never Again"- 5:21 (K-Ci & JoJo)  
"Makes Me Sweat"- 4:57 (Big Pun & Beenie Man) 
"Your Home Is in My Heart"- 5:01 (Boyz II Men & Chanté Moore)   
"Free Again"- 6:17 (Soul II Soul, Jazzie B & Caron Wheeler) 
"Make My Body Hot"- 5:17 (Diana King) 
"The Art of Seduction"- 5:07 (Maxi Priest) 
"Let Me Have You"- 3:08 (Meshell Ndegeocello) 
"Dance for Me"- 5:09 (Kevin Ford & Rufus Blaq)  
"Escape to Jamaica"- 3:46 (Lady Saw & Nadine Sutherland)
"Jazzie's Groove"- 4:39 (Jazzie B)

Charts

Weekly charts

Year-end charts

Certifications

References

External links

1998 soundtrack albums
1990s film soundtrack albums
Reggae soundtracks
Hip hop soundtracks
MCA Records soundtracks
Contemporary R&B soundtracks
Albums produced by Wyclef Jean
Albums produced by Jerry Duplessis
Albums produced by Jimmy Jam and Terry Lewis